The 2021–22 season was MTK Budapest FC's 119th competitive season, 2nd consecutive season in the OTP Bank Liga and 133rd year in existence as a football club.

Squad

Transfers

Summer

In:

Out:

Source:

Winter

In:

Out:

Source:

Competitions

Overview

Nemzeti Bajnokság I

League table

Results summary

Results by round

Matches

Hungarian Cup

Appearances and goals 
Last updated on 16 May 2022.

|-
|colspan="14"|Youth players:

|-
|colspan="14"|Out to loan:

|-
|colspan="14"|Players no longer at the club:

|}

Top scorers
Includes all competitive matches. The list is sorted by shirt number when total goals are equal.
Last updated on 16 May 2022

Disciplinary record
Includes all competitive matches. Players with 1 card or more included only.

Last updated on 16 May 2022

Clean sheets
Last updated on 16 May 2022

References

External links
 Official Website
 fixtures and results
 History and others

2021-22
Mtk Budapest